{{safesubst:#invoke:RfD||2=Nepalese diaspora|month = March
|day =  4
|year = 2023
|time = 22:28
|timestamp = 20230304222813

|content=
REDIRECT Non-Resident Nepali

}}